The Nabão is a river in Portugal. It was known to the Romans as Nabanus. Before entering the territory of Tomar it has his biggest source in a place called Agroal. The swift waters of the Nabão once fed the factories of Tomar.

The river is associated with the tale of Santa Iria.

New Plans for Nabão
The Nabão will see numerous changes in Tomar, as a major improvement plan is under way, which will include construction of new road and foot bridges, promenades and gardens.

References

Rivers of Portugal